The following list includes all of the Canadian Register of Historic Places listings in the British Columbia Coast area, excluding Vancouver Island. This includes the following districts:
Central Coast Regional District
Kitimat-Stikine Regional District
Mount Waddington Regional District
Powell River Regional District
Skeena-Queen Charlotte Regional District
Strathcona Regional District
Sunshine Coast Regional District

References 

(references appear in the table above as external links)

British Columbia Coast